Haridas Kesaria (died. March 1527; Devnagari: हरिदास केसरिया), or Haridas Mahiyaria, was a 16th-century Mewar chieftain, warrior and poet from Rajasthan. In the Battle of Gagron in 1519, he fought alongside the Mewar army led by Rana Sanga, capturing and imprisoning the Sultan Mahmud Khalji II of Malwa, thus quickly ending the war. He was a close friend of Rana Sanga, participating in many battles and campaigns of Mewar kingdom.

Clan and family 
Sources:

The Kesaria clan of the Charanas originally belonged to Patan region of Gujarat, named after an ancestor Kesaria-ji. Kesaria-ji lived in Patan under the rule of Siddharaj Jaisimha, who honored him with a jagir of Genasara including 6 villages. In time, a descendent of Kesaria-ji, Mandan Kesaria left Genasara and came to Mewar, where the Maharana being pleased with his talent and knowledge, awarded him the jagir of Mahiyari including 6 villages. It is from this jagir, the later Kesaria came to be known as Mahiyaria.

Haridas was born to Mandan Kesaria in Mewar. He, in turn, had four sons; three of which are named:

 Udaibhan
 Keshavdas
 Haribhagat

Keshavdas and Haribhagat died without issue. Haridas's grandson through Udaibhan, Devidas Mahiyaria, was an accomplished warrior. He was the military general of Gopaldas Shaktawat and after their victory in the Battle of Benaras, he was granted a jagir including 24 villages.

Haridas built a temple of kuldevi of Mahiyaria clan, Shri Sunderbai, in the village of Madri (Rajsamand). Another shrine of this goddess was also built in village of Bhildi (Jahazpur), which is still present.

Anecdotes 
Several anecdotes are popular about Haridas. One legend is that once Rana Sanga went hunting with his companions, one of his elephants which was tied nearby became enraged after being teased so that he broke the chain and ran after them. Others ran away but Haridas did not leave Sanga's side. When there was no way to escape, Sanga spoke to Haridas that you keep singing the praises of your kuldevis, why don't you call them today for protection? On this, Haridas said a couplet to his Aradhyashakti Shri Sunderbai-आण दबाया गज अठे, और न हेक उपाय। ‘सुन्दर’ मां सज आवजे, सांगा तणी सहाय।।And immediately they saw that the defiant elephant was being stopped by a force and it calmed down, thus preventing any harm to Sanga and Haridas.

Battle of Gagron (1519) 

Sources:

The battle was fought between the Mewar kingdom on one side and the Malwa Sultanate assisted by Gujarat Sultanate on the other. The Mewar army was reinforced by Rathores of Merta. Sultan Mahmud Khalji II headed the Sultanate army and marched thorugh Gagron where he was faced by a large army of Rana Sanga. In the ensuing battle, Mewar army fought bravely and Haridas captured the Sultan and presented him to Sanga.

In the celebration of this victory, Rana Sanga, pleased with the bravery and courage of Haridas, granted him the fort of Chittor. However, Haridas humbly returned the fortress back to Maharana and accepted a small jagir of twelve villages. The jagir included villages of Madri, Beri, Panchali etc. Panchali remained with Haridas's descendents until modern times.

At the Rana Sanga panorama built in Khanwa (Bharatpur), Sanga's victory in the Battle of Gagron and his benevolent behavior towards the defeated Sultan is displayed in the inscribed historical Dingal verses, authored by Haridas himself:

Death – Battle of Khanwa (1527) 

Throughout his life, Haridas was a valued member of Mewar court and fought many battles. In March 1527, Haridas died fighting valiantly alongside Sanga in the Battle of Khanwa against the Mughal ruler, Babur.

Works 
Haridas was a good poet and some of his miscellaneous works including Dingal Gits on Rana Sanga are found.

 Moja Samaṃda Mālavata Mahābalū (मोज समंद मालवत महाबलू)
 Dhana Sāṃgā Hāta Hamīra Kalodhara (धन सांगा हात हमीर कलोधर)

References 

1527 deaths
History of Udaipur
Charan
History of South Asia
Rajasthani people
Indian Hindus
Dingal poets